Ciudad de Catamayo Airport, formerly known as Camilo Ponce Enriquez Airport  is an airport serving Loja, the capital of the Loja Province in southern Ecuador. Its name was changed from Camilo Ponce Enriquez Airport (after a former president of the country) to Ciudad de Catamayo Airport on 13 May 2013.

There is rising terrain south of the airport, and mountainous terrain in all other quadrants. The Loja non-directional beacon (Ident: LOJ) is located on the field. Several sources still list the airport ICAO code as SETM.

Airlines and destinations

Accidents and incidents
On 19 November 1979, an Ecuadorian Army IAI Arava 201 crashed on takeoff, killing all 16 people on board. General Rafael Rodríquez Palacios and his wife and daughter were among the dead.
On 14 July 1980, Vickers Viscount HC-BHB of Aerolíneas Cóndor was damaged beyond economic repair in a landing accident.

See also
Transport in Ecuador
List of airports in Ecuador

References

External links
OpenStreetMap - Catamayo
OurAirports - Loja
SkyVector - Catamayo
FallingRain - Loja Airport

Airports in Ecuador
Buildings and structures in Loja Province